The Supreme Court of Chile is the highest court in Chile. It also administers the lower courts in the nation. It is located in the capital Santiago.

In the Chilean system, the court lacks the broader power of judicial review—it cannot set binding precedent or invalidate laws. Instead, it acts on a case-by-case basis. Trials are carried out in salas, chambers of at least five judges, presided over by the most senior member.

Membership 
The members of the Supreme Court are appointed by the President from a list of five choices prepared by the sitting members of the court. Two of the choices must be senior judges from appellate courts; the other three may have no judicial experience. The president's choice must then be ratified by a two-thirds majority of the Senate.

Supreme Court justices must be at least 36 years old. Once appointed, a Chilean Supreme Court justice is entitled to remain on the Court until the compulsory retirement age of 75. The only exception is if a justice can be removed by "notorious abandonment of duty," as deemed by a majority of both chambers of Congress.

Current Supreme Court members 

The Supreme Court has twenty-one members, called ministers (ministros). One member is selected to serve a two-year term as President of the Supreme Court. The composition of the Supreme Court changes relatively quickly, as judges attain the retirement age of 75. This list was last updated on 22 January 2016.

Notable decisions

Augusto Pinochet 

The Chilean Supreme Court has been involved in many important human rights cases regarding the former Chilean dictator Augusto Pinochet.
 In July 2002, it dismissed a case against Pinochet, saying that he was unfit to stand trial due to dementia.
 In August 2004, it confirmed a lower court's decision that Pinochet should lose his automatic immunity he acquired from being a former senator.
 In March 2005, it reversed a lower court's decision stripping Pinochet of immunity in the case of the assassination of Carlos Prats.
 In August 2007, it upheld a life sentence for Hugo Salas Wenzel, the first senior official to receive a life term for human rights violations conducted during the reign of Pinochet.

Gay rights 

The Chilean Supreme Court has made controversial decisions in the area of gay rights.
 In 2004, it confirmed a lower court's decision that stripped former judge Karen Atala of custody of her three daughters because she is a lesbian. In 2012, the case was overturned by the Inter-American Court of Human Rights.
 In January 2004, it removed judge Daniel Calvo from his position on the Santiago Court of Appeals, after media reports that he visited a sauna frequented by gay men. (See Spiniak Case.)

Women's health 
 In November 2005, the Chilean Supreme Court ruled that the sale of contraceptive morning-after pill Postinor 2 is constitutional.

Alberto Fujimori 
On September 21, 2007, the court accepted Peru's request to extradite former president Alberto Fujimori, on human rights and corruption charges.

References

External links 
  Chilean Judiciary website
  Supreme Court of Chile in Tamizh

1823 in Chilean law
Government of Chile
Chile
Judiciary of Chile
1823 establishments in Chile
Courts and tribunals established in 1823